MFG can refer to:

 Madagascar Fauna Group, a conservation organization working in Germany with headquarters in Berlin and Munich
 Magellan Financial Group's ticker symbol on the Australian Securities Exchange
 An abbreviation for manufacturing
 Marinefliegergeschwader, an aviation unit of the German Navy
 Mean field games
 MFG.com, an online marketplace serving the global manufacturing community
MfG or mfg, German-language abbreviation for mit freundlichem Gruß or mit freundlichen Grüßen, with the meaning of Best Regards, very common in electronic communication
MfG, a song by Die Fantastischen Vier referring to this greeting
 Middle frontal gyrus, a brain region 
 Mixed flowing gas testing, a type of laboratory environmental testing
 Mizuho Financial Group's ticker symbol on the New York Stock Exchange 
 Muzaffarabad Airport, IATA code
 MFG – Austria People – Freedom – Fundamental Rights - Austrian anti-vaccination party